Zonotriche is a genus of African plants in the grass family.

 Species
 Zonotriche brunnea (J.B.Phipps) Clayton - Zaïre
 Zonotriche decora (Stapf) J.B.Phipps - Zaïre, Tanzania, Angola, Zambia
 Zonotriche inamoena (K.Schum.) Clayton - Zaïre, Tanzania, Angola, Zambia, Malawi, Mozambique, Zimbabwe

References

External links
 Grassbase - The World Online Grass Flora

Panicoideae
Grasses of Africa
Poaceae genera
Taxa named by Charles Edward Hubbard